Haina may refer to:

Haina, a municipality in the district Waldeck-Frankenberg, Hesse, Germany
Haina, Gotha, a municipality in the district of Gotha, Thuringia, Germany
Haina, Hildburghausen, a municipality in the district of Hildburghausen, Thuringia, Germany
Bajos de Haina, a town in the Dominican Republic
Haina (Haida village), a locality in British Columbia, Canada that was formerly the site of the Haida village of that name